Grevillea olivacea, commonly known as olive grevillea, is a species of flowering plant in the family Proteaceae and is endemic to the west coast of Western Australia. It is a dense, erect shrub with elliptic to egg-shaped leaves, and erect clusters of bright red and orange or yellow flowers with a red to yellow style.

Description
The upper surface of the leaves is more or less glabrous and the lower surface is silky-hairy.

Taxonomy
Grevillea olivacea was first formally described by Alex George in the journal Nuytsia from specimens collected on the mainland opposite Snag Island south of Dongara in 1966. The specific epithet (olivacea) refers to the leaf colour, resembling that of the olive (Olea europea).

Distribution and habitat
Olive grevillea grows in shrubland on calcareous sand over limestone in near coastal areas of Western Australia between Jurien Bay and Leeman in the Geraldton Sandplains and Swan Coastal Plain bioregions of south-western Western Australia.

Conservation status
This grevillea is listed as "Priority Four" by the Government of Western Australia Department of Biodiversity, Conservation and Attractions, meaning that it is rare or near threatened.

Use in horticulture
Grevillea olivacea is an ornamental but hardy plant, suitable for use in nature strips and parks and as an informal hedge. It grows well in all soil types provided the drainage is good. It responds well to pruning and is attractive to birds and insects.

References

olivacea
Eudicots of Western Australia
Proteales of Australia
Plants described in 1974
Taxa named by Alex George